Realp DFB railway station is a railway station in the municipality of Realp, in the Swiss canton of Uri. It is the eastern terminus of the Furka Steam Railway, a heritage railway that operates over the Furka Pass route.

History 
Following the opening of the Furka Base Tunnel in 1982, the original FO line over the Furka Pass between Realp and Oberwald was abandoned.  However, that line has been progressively reopened since 1992, as a heritage railway operated by the DFB.

The first portion to be reopened was the section between Realp and Tiefenbach, which has been operational once again since , with its Realp terminus being at Realp DFB.  On , the DFB was extended from its then temporary terminus at Tiefenbach to Furka.  It has since been further extended, through the Furka Summit Tunnel and Muttbach-Belvédère to Gletsch.

At a ceremony to be held on 12 August 2010, the rest of the superseded ex-FO line will return to operation, following the completion of another DFB extension, this time from Gletsch to Oberwald.  The formal reopening of that portion of the line followed the driving of a gold spike at a ceremony on June 18th 2010 to mark its physical reconnection.

Scheduled DFB services between Gletsch and Oberwald will then commence on 13 August 2010.  From that point onwards, there will once again be a train service from Realp all the way over the Furka Pass to Oberwald and return.

Services 
The following services stop at Realp DFB:

References

External links 
 

Railway stations in the canton of Uri